Rita Donagh (born 30 April 1939) is a British artist, known for her realistic paintings and painstaking draughtsmanship.

Early life and education
Rita Donagh began taking classes in life drawing at Bilston College of Further Education in 1954. She studied fine arts at the University of Durham.
Donagh taught at the University of Newcastle upon Tyne where she met Richard Hamilton, whom she later married. She also taught at the University of Reading, the Slade School of Art, and Goldsmiths, University of London.

Career
Her first solo show was at the Nigel Greenwood Gallery in 1972. The Whitworth Art Gallery, Manchester held a retrospective (which toured) in 1977. In the 1960s and 1970s, her work was largely conceptual with her Irish ancestry contributing to the subject of many works depicting the political situation in Northern Ireland. Rita Donagh's work on the H Block prisons in Northern Ireland was shown with her husband Richard Hamilton, at the Institute of Contemporary Art in 1984. Hamilton's influence of collage and oil paint showed up in her works of the 1970s.

Later, she focused on the human figure including such work as Slade of 1994. She continued her interest in politics with works such as Downing Street Declaration (1993) which included a Hamilton-esque, televised image of Prime Minister John Major.

Donagh, who was widowed in 2011, lives and works in Oxfordshire.

Her work is in the permanent collection of the Tate Gallery.

Selected exhibitions

Solo exhibitions 
 1972 - Nigel Greenwood Gallery, London 
 1975 - 'Display''', The Gallery, London 
 1977 - Rita Donagh Paintings and Drawings, Whitworth Art Gallery, Manchester, Touring to Central Art Gallery, Wolverhampton; Arts Council of Northern Ireland Gallery, Belfast; Northern Centre for Contemporary Art, Sunderland; Museum of Modern Art, Oxford 
 1982 - Nigel Greenwood Gallery, London 
 1983 -Orchard Gallery, Derry 
 1984 - ICA Gallery, London and Central School of Art and Design, London
 1994 - 197419841994, Cornerhouse, Manchester, Camden Arts Centre, London; Irish Museum of Modern Art, Dublin

 Group exhibitions 
 1958 - Young Contemporaries, London
 1959 - Young Contemporaries, London
 1960 - Bear Lane Gallery, Oxford
 1972 - John Moores Exhibition 8, Liverpool (prize-winner), and Drawings, Museum of Modern Art, Oxford
 1973 - I I English Artists, Kunsthalle, Baden-Baden and Kunsthalle, Bremen
 1974 - British Painting, Hayward Gallery, London
 1975 - 7th International Festival of Painting, Cagnes sur Mer, France, and Contemporary British Drawings, 13th Biennale, São Paulo, and Body and Soul, Walker Art Gallery, Liverpool
 1976 - Arte Inglese Oggi, Palazzo Reale, Milan
 1978 - Hayward Annual '78, Hayward Gallery, London, and Nigel Greenwood Gallery, London, and Art for Society, Whitechapel Art Gallery, London
 1979 - European Dialogue, Sydney Biennale
 1980 - The Newcastle Connection, Newcastle upon Tyne 
 1983 - The Granada Connection, Whitworth Art Gallery, Manchester 
 1985 - Painting and Photography, St. Martin's School of Art, London, and Hayward Annual '85, Hayward Gallery, London 
 1986 - Nigel Greenwood Gallery, London 
 1987 - Attitudes to Ireland, Tate Gallery, London 
 1992 - A Centenary Exhibition, University of Reading, and Declarations of War, Kettle's Yard, Cambridge 
 1993 - Writing on the Wall, Tate Gallery, London 
 1996 - Face a l'Histoire, Centre Georges Pompidou, Paris 
 1998 - Lines of Desire, Oldham Art Gallery and Museum 
 2001 - Closer Still, The Winchester Gallery, Winchester 
 2002 - Display, Tate Modern, London

 Public collections 
 Arts Council Collection, Hayward Gallery, London
 British Council
 Leeds City Art Gallery
 Hunterian Art Gallery, University of Glasgow
 Tate
 Ulster Museum - National Museums and Galleries of Northern Ireland
 Whitworth Art Gallery, University of Manchester
 Victoria and Albert Museum
 Hatton Gallery, University of Newcastle upon Tyne
 Imperial War Museum
The New Art Gallery, Walsall.

References

 Bibliography Rita Donagh: Paintings and Drawings (exhibition catalog, ed. M. Regan; Manchester, U. Manchester, Whitworth A.G., 1977)Rita Donagh 197419841994: Paintings and Drawings (exhibition catalog, essay Dr. Sarat Maharaj, Manchester, Cornerhouse, 1994)Civil Rights etc.: Rita Donagh and Richard Hamilton'' (exhibition catalog, Dublin, Dublin City Gallery The Hugh Lane, 2011)

1939 births
Living people
British contemporary artists
Alumni of Durham University
Academics of Goldsmiths, University of London
Academics of Newcastle University
Academics of the Slade School of Fine Art
Academics of the University of Reading
British women painters
21st-century British women artists